The Caribbean sculptured sea catfish (Notarius neogranatensis) is a species of catfish in the family Ariidae. It was described by Arturo Acero Pizarro and Ricardo Betancur-Rodríguez in 2002, originally under the genus Arius. It inhabits brackish and marine waters in Colombia, on the Caribbean coast.

References

Ariidae
Fish described in 2002